Neutralized is the fourth album by avant-garde metal band Ram-Zet released on October 12, 2009 in the US by Ascendance Records. The album was recorded from 2008 to early 2009. Ram-Zet employed a lengthy, busy writing schedule with the album being mixed in summer of 2009 to be ready for a tentative release date of September.

Track listing
 "Infamia" - 4:43
 "I Am Dirt" - 5:32
 "222" - 4:59
 "Addict" - 10:27
 "God Don't Forgive" - 5:05
 "Beautiful Pain" - 10:28
 "To Ashes" - 8:21
 "Requiem" - 10:19

Credits

Ram-Zet 
 Zet - Vocals, Guitar, Programming, Music, Lyrics, Arranging, Producer
 Sfinx - Vocals, Lyrics
 Sareeta - Violin, Backing vocals
 Küth - Drums, Percussion
 Ka - Keyboards, Backing vocals
 Lanius - Bass, Didgeridoo

Additional musicians and production 
 Ram-Zet - Arranging, Producer 
 Space Valley Studios - Recording studio
 Brett Caldas-Lima at Tower Studio - Mixing, Mastering
 Lanius - Photography - Digital image processing
 Lanius, Ka, Sfinx and Zet - Cover Artwork, Cover Layout

2009 albums
Ram-Zet albums